Intoshia is a genus of worms belonging to the family Rhopaluridae.

Species:

Intoshia leptoplanae 
Intoshia linei 
Intoshia major 
Intoshia metchnikovi 
Intoshia paraphanostomae 
Intoshia variabili

References

Orthonectida